Alastair "Al" McFarland (born 2 June 1989) is a former Australian-American rugby union player who played for the USA Eagles. He played as a number 8 or flanker.

McFarland won USA Rugby Club Division I National Championships with New York Athletic Club in 2012 and 2015.

In July 2015, he earned his first National Team selection to the 2015 Pacific Nations Cup, earning his first cap against Japan in Sacramento. Following his international debut, he continued to make appearances with the Men's Eagles, suiting up as a starter for 6 of his 9 total matches including the 2015 Rugby World Cup.

In 2017, McFarland joined the team for the 2017 Americas Rugby Championship where he helped the United States clinch their first ever title victory in the tournament.

References

External links
 
 Al McFarland at USA Rugby

1989 births
Living people
American rugby union players
United States international rugby union players
Rugby union flankers
Rugby union number eights